Puertas is a municipality located in the province of Salamanca, Castile and León, Spain. It is integrated into the Vitigudino region and the La Ramajería sub-region. It is occupying a total area of 62.71  km² and according to the municipal register prepared by the INE in 2017, it has a population of 79 inhabitants.

Economy 
The economy of Puertas depends exclusively on livestock farms, mainly of the Morucha and Charolesa breed.

References

External links

Municipalities in the Province of Salamanca